Zdeňka Padevětová (born 12 December 1958) is a former Czech archer who represented Czechoslovakia at the 1980 Summer Olympic Games.

Life 

She was born in Helsinki.

Padevětová competed at the 1980 Summer Olympic Games in the women's individual event and finished fourth with a score of 2405 points.

Padevětová is a member of the Czech Archery Hall of Fame.

References

External links 

 Profile on worldarchery.org

1958 births
Living people
Czech female archers
Olympic archers of Czechoslovakia
Archers at the 1980 Summer Olympics